Fanni Juhász (born 31 March 1981) is a Hungarian pole vaulter who competes in international level events. Her greatest achievement was winning a bronze medal at the 2000 World Junior Championships in Athletics in Santiago, Chile.

References

1981 births
Living people
Sportspeople from Debrecen
Hungarian female pole vaulters